T2A may refer to:
 T2A peptide, a 2A self-cleaving peptides.
 Ultima Online: The Second Age, an Ultima Online expansion commonly abbreviated as T2A.
 A temperature classification in electrical equipment in hazardous areas.